Elijah, Eliya, or Elias of Nisibis (11February 975– 18July 1046) was a cleric of the Church of the East, who served as bishop of Beth Nuhadra (1002–1008) and archbishop of Nisibis (1008–1046). He has been called the most important Christian writer in Arabic—or even throughout non-Christian Asia—during the 11th century. He is best known for his Chronography, which is an important source for the history of Sassanid Persia.

Name
He shares the name of the Biblical prophet Elijah (Eliyahu), whose name meant "My God is Jah". The Syriac form of his name is Ēlīyā or Ēlīyāh (ܐܹܠܝܼܵܐ) in Classical and Eastern Syriac and Ēlīyō (ܐܶܠܺܝܳܐ) in Western Syriac. In Latin translation, this became Elias.

He is usually distinguished as "Elijah of Nisibis" from the location of his archbishopric. He is also known by the patronymic , meaning "Elijah, son of Shenna", in reference to the place of his birth.

Life

Elijah was born in Shenna, just south of the Little Zab's confluence with the Tigris (near present-day Al-Zab, Iraq) on 11 February 975.

On Sunday, 15September 994, he was ordained as a priest at the monastery of Mar Shemʿon by Yohannes, archbishop of Fars and bishop of Shenna. He studied throughout northern Mesopotamia, including Mosul.

On Sunday, 15February 1002, he was consecrated bishop of Beth Nuhadra (present-day Dohuk, Iraq) by Yohannan, who had become the Patriarch of the Church of the East in 1000 by appealing directly to the Abbasid governor at Shiraz without regard to the usual election procedures.

On Sunday, 26December 1008, he succeeded Yahballaha as archbishop of Nisibis (present-day Nusaybin, Turkey).

From 15–29 July 1026, he paid a series of visits—the "Seven Sessions"—to the Abbasid vizier Abu'l-Qasim al-Husayn ibn Ali al-Maghribi to discuss Christian doctrines and other topics. Additional meetings between the two were held in December 1026 and June 1027. Three letters—two by Elijah and one by the vizier—are preserved from their correspondence the following year, showing their continuing good relations.

He died on 18 July 1046 at Mayyafariqin.

Works

Chronography
Elijah is best known for his Chronography or Chronology, which forms an important source concerning the history of Sassanid Persia. It is divided into two sections, a chronicle modeled after Eusebius's Ecclesiastical History and a treatment of calendars and calendrical calculations. It is exceptional among Syriac chronicles for the large amount of civil history Elijah included among his ecclesiastical notices. The chronicle includes separate lists of the Sassanid dynasty (after the lost 7th-century work of James of Edessa) and the patriarchs of Seleucia (after the lost 5th-century work of Annianus of Alexandria). The popes and other patriarchs are included in the general annals which begin during the reign of the Roman emperor Tiberius and end with the year 1018. His treatment of calendrical systems has tables for computation of the Syriac and Persian new years and includes several Zoroastrian calendars, along with their feasts and holidays. As seen, many of Elijah's own sources, which he thoroughly documents, have now been lost and his own work is preserved in only a single manuscript, which fortunately includes few omissions. The manuscript is in Syriac, with most paragraphs in the first section followed by an Arabic translation. The Chronography was the last East Syrian text to be written in Syriac.

There have been two published editions of the work:
 . 
 . &

Book of Sessions
Elijah's Book of Sessions or Dialogues claims to relate his conversations during his seven visits to the Abbasid vizier Abu'l-Qasim al-Husayn ibn Ali al-Maghribi. Dedicated to the "honorable, believing, elder brother" Abu al-ʿAla Saʿid ibn Sahl al-Katib, the work is intended as a literary apologetic as much as record of the events of the seven meetings, with its epilogue including the imprimatur of the patriarchal secretary Abu al-Faraj ʿAbd Allah ibn at-Tayyib. In order, the chapters cover:

 God's unity and trinity
 Jesus's incarnation of divine and human natures
 Quranic support for considering some forms of Christianity as a monotheistic religion
 Logical and miraculous justifications for various Christian doctrines
 Elijah's own profession of monotheism
 Language and considerations of its importance in theology
 Christian perspectives on astrology, Islam, and the soul

According to Elijah's account, the vizier asking for the meetings after he had experienced a miraculous cure at the hands of a Christian monk, causing him to reconsider his previous understanding of their faith as polytheistic and unfaithful to God. It is particularly remembered for its statement of Christian monotheism in trinity in its 5th dialogue.

A full critical edition of the Book of Sessions along with the correspondence between Elijah and Abu'l-Qasim al-Maghribi was published by Nikolai N. Seleznyov.

Other works

Elijah also composed other theological and scholarly works.

He wrote defenses of Nestorianism against both Islam and other Christian denominations and treatises on Syrian canon law, asceticism, and ethics. His guide to "rational management" of anxiety is also dedicated to the Abbasid vizier, whom he claims requested such a book during their sessions together. It advocates cultivating a general thankfulness; treatment of general anxiety through the religious virtues of piety, gratitude, chastity, humility, mercy, and repentance; and treatment of specific anxieties through the philosophical virtues of seeking advice, behaving well, and being generous, just, and forgiving. His "Letter on the Unity of the Creator and Trinity of His Hypotases" states the arguments for trinitarianism for a curious Islamic judge. His "Letter on the Merit of Chastity" attempts to refute Muʿtazilī al-Jāhiz's (. 869) arguments in favor of physical pleasure.

He also composed a Syriac grammar and a Syriac–Arabic dictionary, The Book of the Interpreter. Because a standard Arabic script had not yet developed, the Arabic sections of the book were written using Garshuni, a transliteration of Arabic into the Syriac alphabet. The work was further translated into Latin by Thomas Obicini as his 1636 .

Editions of these works include:

 .
 .

Legacy
In addition to Elijah's importance to Persian history and for his preservation of passages of otherwise lost ancient and medieval authors, he became famed throughout the Islamic world for his studious method and wide-ranging expertise in Christian and Islamic theology, language and literature, philosophy, medicine, and mathematics.

Notes

References

In addition to surviving manuscripts of Elijah's own works, the other primary source for his story is Mari ibn Sulaiman's Book of the Tower, as expanded and emended by Amr ibn Matta and Saliba ibn Yuhanna.

Citations

Bibliography
 .
 .
 .
 .
 .
 . & 
 .
 .
 

975 births
1046 deaths
11th-century people from the Abbasid Caliphate
11th-century historians from the Abbasid Caliphate
11th-century Christian theologians
11th-century bishops of the Church of the East
Linguists
Nestorians in the Abbasid Caliphate